Abdullah Salem Ali al-Nakha'ai (born 1962) is a Yemeni military officer. On 7 November 2018, he was appointed by Abdrabbuh Mansur Hadi as chief of the Yemeni Army and promoted to the rank of major general.
Previously, he was commander of the Yemeni Navy and Coastal Defence Forces (2012-2018).

References 

Yemeni generals
Living people
Yemeni military officers
Military of Yemen
Ministry of Defense (Yemen)
1962 births
Chiefs of the General Staff (Yemen)